August Johannes Dorner (13 May 1846 in Schiltach, Württemberg – 17 April 1920 in Hannover) was a German Protestant theologian. He was the son of Isaak August Dorner.

Biography 
After studying at Göttingen, Tübingen and Berlin, he served as vicar to the German congregation in Lyon and Marseilles. From 1870 to 1873 he was a lecturer at the University of Göttingen, then worked as a professor of theology and as co-director of the theological seminary at Wittenberg (1874-1889). In 1889 he was appointed professor of systematic theology at the University of Königsberg.

Published works 
Amongst his works is Augustinus : sein theologisches System und seine religionsphilosoph Anschauung ("Augustinus, his theological system and its religious-philosophical viewpoint", 1873). His other principal writings include:
 Das menschliche Handeln : philosophische Ethik, 1895 – Human action: philosophical ethics.
 Die Entstehung der christlichen Glaubenslehren, 1906 – The emergence of Christian doctrines.
 Individuelle und soziale Ethik, 1906 – Individual and social ethics.
 Pessimismus, Nietzsche und naturalismus, mit besonderer beziehung auf die religion, 1911 – Pessimism; Nietzsche and naturalism with a special reference to religion. 
 Die Metaphysik des Christentums, 1913 – The metaphysics of Christianity.
 Also, he was the author of the article on Isaak Dorner in the Allgemeine deutsche Biographie.

Legacy
Dorner is commemorated in the naming of the August-Dorner-Ring in Lantershofen, Grafschaft.

References

1846 births
1920 deaths
19th-century German Protestant theologians
20th-century German Protestant theologians
People from Rottweil (district)
Academic staff of the University of Königsberg
German male non-fiction writers
19th-century male writers